Lucas Ariel Varaldo (born 24 February 2002) is an Argentine professional footballer who plays as a forward for Lanús.

Club career
Varaldo, having joined at the age of six, is a product of the Lanús youth system, notably scoring a hat-trick against Estudiantes in February 2020 as their reserves won the title. He made the breakthrough into Luis Zubeldía's first-team squad in the following December, initially appearing on the substitute's bench for a Copa de la Liga Profesional victory away to Aldosivi on 13 December. Varaldo's senior debut arrived on 20 December in the same competition versus Defensa y Justicia, after the forward replaced Gonzalo Torres with seventeen minutes left of an eventual 1–1 draw.

International career
In 2019, Varaldo was selected by Pablo Aimar for the 2019 FIFA U-17 World Cup in Brazil. He appeared just once, against Tajikistan, as Argentina exited at the round of sixteen.

Career statistics
.

Notes

References

External links

2002 births
Living people
People from Lomas de Zamora
Argentine footballers
Argentina youth international footballers
Association football forwards
Argentine Primera División players
Club Atlético Lanús footballers
Sportspeople from Buenos Aires Province